Jan Novotný (born 15 April 1982) is a professional Czech football player who played in the Gambrinus liga for clubs including FK Viktoria Žižkov, FK Bohemians Prague (Střížkov) and SK Kladno.

References
 
 
 Guardian Football

Czech footballers
1982 births
Living people
Czech First League players
FK Viktoria Žižkov players
SK Kladno players
FK Bohemians Prague (Střížkov) players
Association football midfielders